Bruce Bourke (born 5 February 1929) is an Australian former swimmer. He competed in two events at the 1948 Summer Olympics.

References

External links
 

1929 births
Living people
Australian male backstroke swimmers
Australian male freestyle swimmers
Olympic swimmers of Australia
Swimmers at the 1948 Summer Olympics
Swimmers from Sydney
Sportsmen from New South Wales
20th-century Australian people